Dihydrocarveol dehydrogenase (carveol dehydrogenase (ambiguous)) is an enzyme with systematic name menth-8-en-2-ol:NAD+ oxidoreductase. This enzyme catalyses the following chemical reaction

 menth-8-en-2-ol + NAD+  menth-8-en-2-one + NADH + H+

This enzyme from the Gram-positive bacterium Rhodococcus erythropolis DCL14 forms part of the carveol and dihydrocarveol degradation pathway. The enzyme accepts all eight stereoisomers of menth-8-en-2-ol as substrate, although some isomers are converted faster than others. The preferred substrates are (+)-neoisodihydrocarveol, (+)-isodihydrocarveol, (+)-dihydrocarveol and (-)-isodihydrocarveol.

References

External links 
 

EC 1.1.1